Edward Byllynge was a British colonial administrator and governor of West New Jersey from 1680 to 1687, until his death in England. Byllynge owned a large section of land in New Jersey with the Quakers.

Byllynge was a London brewer. He purchased land in New Jersey in 1674 from Sir John Berkeley, in deal also involving John Fenwick. Byllynge's financial position was complicated by bankruptcy, and after negotiations involving William Penn, the purchase in 1675 was reassigned to a trust involving Fenwick, Penn and others with Byllynge. The planting of Quaker colonies then proceeded.

Byllynge was an unpopular governor with the settlers of New Jersey. He never even set foot on the tract of land he owned. In 1682, Byllynge was one of the 24 proprietaries who owned a piece of West New Jersey.

References

Year of birth missing
1687 deaths
Colonial governors of New Jersey
English emigrants
British Quakers
Governors of West New Jersey
People of colonial New Jersey